Róbson Lopes da Silva (born 17 January 1975 in Diadema, São Paulo) is a former Brazilian football player.

References

1975 births
Living people
Brazilian footballers
CR Flamengo footballers
Club Athletico Paranaense players
FC Chernomorets Novorossiysk players
Russian Premier League players
Brazilian expatriate footballers
Expatriate footballers in Russia
CR Vasco da Gama players
Clube Atlético Bragantino players
América Futebol Clube (RN) players

Association football midfielders
Footballers from São Paulo (state)
People from Diadema